Timothy Leigh Williams (born August 16, 1966) is an American actor who is best known for his appearances in advertisements for the hotel website Trivago and his roles on German television and in German film, including the German series Gute Zeiten, schlechte Zeiten in the 2010s.  He also played in the movies Valkyrie (2008), Ninja Assassin (2009) and Labyrinth of Lies (2014) and performed a music album, Magnolia City, around 2018.

Williams went to Robert E. Lee High School in Houston, Texas, and graduated in 1985. He went on to study at the Lee Strasberg Theatre and Film Institute

Personal life 
Williams moved to Germany in 2001. He is twice-divorced and has two sons.

In April 2019, Williams was found asleep at the wheel of a car, with his foot on the brake in Houston traffic, after which he failed a field sobriety test.  The next week, a court hearing on the matter in Harris County Criminal Court was postponed to an indeterminate date. The case was fully dismissed in February 2020.

Partial filmography 
 The Mouse (1996) – Frank "The Gator" Lux
 Grind (1997) – Scott
 Fast Food Fast Women (2000) – Kindergarten Teacher
 The Sopranos (1999) - Mr. Meskimmin ("Down Neck")
  (2003) – David
 Beyond the Sea (2004) – Bodyguard
 Drawn in Blood (2006) – Eric
 Valkyrie (2008) – Doctor
 Ninja Assassin (2009) – Europol Cell Guard
  (2009) – CIA-Officer
 Chicken with Plums (2011) – Le docteur américain
 A Coffee in Berlin (2012) – Barkeeper
 Trivago (2012) – Trivago Guy 
 The Apparition (2012) – Office Executive
 The Forbidden Girl (2013) – Sheriff Reynolds
 Labyrinth of Lies (2014) – Major Parker

References

External links 
 Tim Williams — official site (requires JavaScript)
 

1966 births
Living people
American expatriates in Germany
American expatriate actors in Germany
American male film actors
Male actors from Houston